The Devil Dodger is a lost 1917 American silent Western film directed by Clifford Smith and starring Roy Stewart. It was produced and released by Triangle Film Corporation.

Cast

References

External links
 
 

1917 films
1917 Western (genre) films
1917 lost films
American black-and-white films
Films directed by Clifford Smith
Lost American films
Lost Western (genre) films
Silent American Western (genre) films
Triangle Film Corporation films
1910s American films